Maximiliano Hernández Martínez (20 October 1882 – 15 May 1966) was a Salvadoran military officer and politician who served as the president of El Salvador from 4 December 1931 to 28 August 1934 in an acting capacity and again in an official capacity from 1 March 1935 until his resignation on 9 May 1944. He was the leader of El Salvador during World War II. While he served as President Arturo Araujo's vice president and defense minister, a directorate seized power during a palace coup and afterwards named Hernández Martínez president of El Salvador.

He served as president for almost 12 years and ruled the nation with an authoritarian one-party state led by the fascistic and anti-communist National Pro Patria Party. His rule was marked by rigged and fraudulent elections and brutality, most notably the 1932 Salvadoran peasant massacre, known as La Matanza ("The Massacre"). Under his rule, El Salvador joined the Allied Powers during World War II on 8 December 1941 following the Bombing of Pearl Harbor. He modernized the nation through infrastructure projects such as the Pan-American Highway and the Cuscatlán Bridge. He also established the Central Reserve Bank, but he was eventually forced to resign on 9 May 1944 after a military mutiny the month prior and massive civil unrest.

Early life 

Maximiliano Hernández Martínez was born on 20 October 1882 in San Matías, La Libertad, El Salvador. His parents were Raymundo Hernández and Petronila Martínez.

He studied secondary education at the National Institute of El Salvador. After finishing his secondary education studies, he entered the Polytechnic School of Guatemala, where he obtained the degree of Sub-Lieutenant. He returned to El Salvador during the presidency of General Tomás Regalado Romero. Upon his return, he studied at the Facility of Jurisprudence and Social Sciences at the University of El Salvador (UES).

He was promoted to lieutenant on 17 November 1903; to captain on 23 August 1906; to captain major the same year, during the Third Totoposte War with Guatemala where Hernández Martínez fought under Regalado Romero; to lieutenant colonel on 6 May 1909; and finally to colonel on 15 June 1914. On 14 July 1919, the National Legislative Assembly promoted him to the rank of brigadier general and the legislative decree was sanctioned by the president Jorge Meléndez Ramírez on 17 September. He became Minister of National Defense on 1 March 1931.

Rise to power 

In the 1931 presidential election he was initially a candidate for his National Republican Party. He joined forces with Arturo Araujo of the Labor Party, running on a reformist platform. The ticket won the election with a 46.65% margin and 106,777 votes in what was considered the first free multiparty election in Salvadoran history and the last for over half a century.

The reason for the coup was that military personnel had not been paid their salary, although it is sometimes attributed to the fall in prices of coffee abroad. The reality is that officers were not paid and the Finance Minister had only paid the police, who remained loyal to the president. The army officers were angry and ousted President Araujo on 2 December 1931. In its place, the military officers established the Civic Directory. Two days later on 4 December, Maximiliano Hernández Martínez became Acting President of El Salvador.

The United States did not recognize the legitimacy of Hernández Martínez's rise to power or government due to the 1923 Central American Treaty of Peace and Amity and only recognized his government after his government put down the communist uprising in early 1932. Hernández Martínez eventually denounced El Salvador's membership of the treaty on 26 December 1932.

Presidency

La Matanza 

Legislative elections were scheduled for 3–5 January 1932 and Hernández Martínez's government promised free and fair elections. To participate in the election, however, voters had to be registered in their municipalities alongside their party, thus giving the government a list of Communist Party members. The communists won several municipalities but Hernández Martínez cancelled the election results and cancelled follow up elections scheduled for 10–12 January.

In response to the election cancellation, many in the Salvadoran Communist Party (PCES) believed that armed insurrection was the only choice since both democracy and Hernández Martínez's authoritarian government had both failed. The rebellion was planned for mid-January. Meanwhile, indigenous peasants also planned a revolt of their own to protest the poor living conditions in western El Salvador.

On 22 January 1932, peasants in western El Salvador attacked military barracks and wealthy estates and killed around 100 people. The rebels, led by Feliciano Ama, Farabundo Martí, Mario Zapata, and Alfonso Luna, seized control of the towns of Juayúa, Nahuizalco, Izalco, and Tlacopan. Barracks in towns such as Ahuachapán, Santa Tecla, and Sonsonate resisted the attacks and remained under government control.

Hernández Martínez responded quickly to the uprising in western El Salvador and ordered the army to put down the revolt. He organized several of his military officers to accomplish specific tasks to crush the rebellion. General José Tomás Calderón was tasked with evicting rebels from western El Salvador, Colonel Osmín Aguirre y Salinas was to arrest communist leader Farabundo Martí, Colonel Salvador Ochoa had to recapture Santa Tecla, and Major Saturnino Cortez had to recapture Tacuba.

After 72 hours, the rebellion was crushed. The specific number of victims is unknown, but estimates range from 10,000 to 40,000 for the entire rebellion. American historian Thomas Anderson says there were no more than 10,000 killed. He does accept that the military killed people without a judgement and that they were usually killed by a firing squad after being compelled to dig their own graves. Usually they only needed to be Indian, usually male, from the town, and listed as voters of the Communist party in that town. The leaders of the rebellion were all executed: Feliciano Ama was lynched by the Army while the communist leaders were executed by firing squad.

After the conflict, survivors attempted to flee to Guatemala. In response, Guatemalan President and dictator Jorge Ubico ordered the Guatemalan-Salvadoran border to be closed and handed over anyone who attempted to cross to the Salvadoran army.

As resolution of the conflict, the Legislative Assembly of El Salvador issued Legislative Decree No. 121 on 11 July 1932, which granted unconditional amnesty to anyone who committed crimes of any nature in order to "restore order, repress, persecute, punish and capture those accused of the crime of rebellion of this year."

Authoritarian presidency 

Hernández Martínez's policies had various effects on the country's cultural, political, and economic life. By centralizing government, he participated in almost all decision-making, directing almost every single one of his government's activities. He distanced the military, except himself, from the civil administration of the country, resulting in military officers being a minority within his cabinet. The salaries for government officials and for the military were extremely low, compared to previous times. This discouraged military personnel from being involved in government, despite the fact that a demand for higher wages was one of the reasons the military toppled Araujo's government in 1931. However, he always preferred to have military protection, and transferred the presidential office and his family residence to the then Normal School for Boys, next to the El Zapote Barracks.

He promoted economic growth based on expansion of large coffee plantations, thus benefiting landowners and initiating links between the military and the oligarchy. During his presidency, the creation of the Central Reserve Bank and the Mortgage Bank, the Salvadoran Coffee Company, the Rural Credit Box, the Cotton Cooperative, the General Directorate of Public Works, and the Social Improvement, developed a commendable work within its functions.

Roads were built throughout the country such as the Pan-American Highway and the Flor Blanca National Stadium (now the Estadio Jorge "Mágico" González) where the Third Central American and Caribbean Games were held in 1935. Buildings such as the telegraph building, the castle of the former National Guard (current headquarters of the General Directorate of the National Civil Police), and large bridges such as the Cuscatlán Bridge over the Lempa River were built in 1942.

On 23 February 1932 the Salvadoran government defaulted on its external debt and stated that it would not pay the loans if the interest was not reduced and the term extended. The net debt, that is to say without interest, was fully paid off in 1938, although the interest was not paid off until 1960. Once the debt had been paid off, Hernández Martínez proposed, reflected on a commemorative plaque placed in the Legislative Assembly, the policy of non-acquisition of international loans in the future. Despite this initiative, he also acquired loans for the construction of the Pan-American Highway. On the other hand, on 12 March 1932, he decreed the Moratorium Law, by which he reduced the interest of debtors facing bankruptcy. In addition, with the objective of stabilizing the value of the colón, he created the Central Reserve Bank of El Salvador in 1934, indemnifying private banks to stop issuing money.

As for policies referring directly to the population, his theosophical customs prevailed. For example, when a smallpox plague broke out in San Salvador, he had street lamps in the squares covered with blue paper, hoping that "invisible doctors" would save those who were destined to live. Among other things, he established that anyone who asked for a formal education should be considered a communist. He discouraged workers and employees from getting an education because, in his words, "soon there would be no more people willing to work in cleaning tasks."

In July 1932, he established the Social Improvement Fund, and in October, the National Board of Social Improvement, whose main activity was to acquire homes and provide soft loans to farmers to buy them. However, this activity did not bring results expected by the population, since the beneficiaries were much fewer than what had been projected. Despite the fact that it was described as an agrarian reform, it was not, since the lands were not expropriated, but bought at a price market and sold at a lower one, using national funds that would never be reintegrated and that would pass into the hands of the landowners of the time. Homes were also built to be sold under the same conditions, although this occurred on a smaller scale.

Hernández Martínez modified the Police Law of 1879, prohibiting civilians from carrying firearms, knives, machetes or slits, and making defiance of said ordinance a crime. He also established that those who did not hold legal offices or legitimate jobs would be persecuted and punished as lazy. The penalty for theft was the amputation of a hand and, in the face of recidivism, the sentence was death by firing squad. He established strong alliances with the Catholic Church, obtaining the benefit of the two monsignors of the time, Monsignor Belloso and Monsignor Chávez y González, who were always present in political executions and who, after the 1932 uprising, offered masses in gratitude for the military victory.

In military matters, he strengthened the professionalization of officers through military study scholarships, especially to Italy. He financed the construction of a war tank, armed with six heavy machine guns. On 24 April 1938, Eberhardt Bohnstedt, a Wehrmacht general, was appointed as director of the Salvadoran military school.

In 1939, he called the Constituent Assembly to draft and ratify a new constitution, which had provisions for the female vote, under certain conditions of social origin and level of education.

In 1943, Hernández Martínez tried to increase the export tariffs to obtain more revenue for El Salvador, which harmed the relationship he had with the oligarchs.

World War II 

The advent of the Second World War meant an increase in exports to the United States and the improvement of the Salvadoran economy. This allowed Hernández Martínez to carry out some social reforms and a slight redistribution of land through an agrarian program.

Hernández Martínez was very attracted to the successes of the European fascist governments, especially Hitler, Mussolini, and Franco. In 1938 he appointed Eberhardt Bohnstedt, a general of the Wehrmacht, as director of the Salvadoran military school. In addition, he opened diplomatic relations with the Spanish dictator, Francisco Franco and was one of the first to recognize his government. In addition, he gave diplomatic recognition to the Japanese puppet state of Manchukuo and the German puppet state of the Slovak Republic. Trade with Germany and Italy increased from 1935 to 1937 and El Salvador bought several planes from the Italian government for the Salvadoran Air Force since American planes were too expensive. El Salvador sent military officers to Italy for military training. From 1930 up until 1940, El Salvador imported and exported more to Germany that the United States. Fascist influence was so abundant in El Salvador that schoolchildren were taught to do the Roman salute and 300 men imitating the Italian Blackshirts marching in the streets on San Salvador following the Italian entry into World War II in June 1940.

However, under pressure from the United States, the primary coffee buyer of El Salvador, he had to abandon his sympathies and agreed to align itself alongside the Allies of World War II on 8 December 1941 after the Japanese Bombing of Pearl Harbor. Likewise, German and Italian residents in El Salvador were expropriated of their lands and were sent to concentration camps, which earned them diplomatic recognition from the United States.

That change in his foreign policy, as well as the repression against the communists and opponents of his government, allowed him to obtain greater support from the United States. However, the situation changed due to Hernández Martínez's refusal to receive 3,000 US soldiers to protect the Panama Canal. The United States placed troops in the countries near the Canal, except in El Salvador, given the presidential refusal. The reason Hernández Martínez gave for rejecting the American request was that, since the arriving troops would have a percentage of black soldiers, there was an imminent risk that they would reproduce in El Salvador and that they would fill El Salvador with black children.

El Salvador sent no men to fight on the battlefield during the war but it did send men to perform maintenance on the Panama Canal. During WWII, Colonel José Castellanos Contreras saved 40,000 Jews in Central Europe by providing them political asylum and fake Salvadoran passports.

Criticisms 

Hernández Martínez's government was widely criticized by various sectors, focusing mainly on his theosophical practices and their repercussions on his actions as ruler. First, the general's belief that the state must have absolute power over individuals led him to convert the state as an individual controller, endowing him with extra-constitutional power over national life, giving him control of the armed forces. He had strict control of the mass media, aligning them in favor of his regime or simply closing them in the face of occasional resistance. Furthermore, he was criticized for the exile of the most important thinkers and artists of the time who did not agree with his government. The harshness of his measures and mainly his contempt for the quality of the human being led him to commit acts that would mark a precedent of violence, a prelude to what would come decades later during the military dictatorship. The media handling extended to the political field, creating conditions so that even abroad he was considered a democratic president. For example, he placed the Communist Party election booth right in front of the Hotel Nuevo Mundo, which housed large numbers of foreigners, especially Americans. The intention was clear: to create an image of democracy to be recognized by the rest of the world as a legitimate president. He went to the lengths of holding presidential elections in 1935, 1939, and 1944, and legislative elections in 1936, 1939, 1944, however, he was the only candidate, he always won 100% of the vote, and his National Pro Patria Party was the only legal political party.

However, the main criticism of his government is the excessive use of force. He used unorthodox repressive methods characterized by violence and disrespect for the integrity of the individual.

End of Hernández Martínez's government 

Given that Hernández Martínez intended to extend his mandate beyond 1944, the military, also dissatisfied with the shooting of opposition officers, rose up against the ruler, and forced him to capitulate in three days. In 1943, Hernández Martínez tried to increase the tax rates on exports to obtain more income for the State, and this broke the relationship he had with the oligarch groups. It was then that civil society, demonstrating against the mass executions of raised officers, rebelled through a sit -down strike that led to the resignation of the dictator.

Palm Sunday Coup 

In response, an armed revolt broke out on Palm Sunday, 2 April 1944, led by intellectuals, business leaders and disloyal segments of the military. While top members of the regime leadership were at home for Holy Week, the strategic First Infantry and the Second Artillery regiments of San Salvador and Santa Ana garrison seized the state radio station, took control of the Air Force and seized Santa Ana's police headquarters and telegraph offices. Santa Ana was bombed from the air as civilians below rallied, overthrew and replaced their city council. However, Gen. Hernández Martínez was able to put down the rebellion with his remaining obedient military units. Martial law, including a police curfew, was declared in effect and savagely enforced. Reprisals against rebels and suspected rebels began right away and lasted for weeks in a highly public and distressing campaign of repression.  More than 100 civilians were shot dead in street demonstrations by the army.

Strike of Fallen Arms 

Soon after, however, in May 1944, Hernández Martínez was deposed by the Strike of Fallen Arms led by students. Their strategy was to avoid direct confrontation with the regime's soldiers by simply, passively, non-violently staying home. During this massive political action, Salvadoran society was completely paralysed until he was deposed. Doctors and other professionals joined on May 5, successfully turning it into a general strike. On May 7 police fired into a group of youths, and fatally struck a 17-year-old who happened to be a U.S. citizen.  This increased the pressure on the regime.

After attempting to negotiate a later departure date, Hernández Martínez resigned on 9 May and had Andrés Ignacio Menéndez appointed as Provisional President. By May 11 the strike was over and he had fled to exile in Guatemala. The revolt then spread to Guatemala, where the similar military leader Jorge Ubico was also forced to resign by 1 July.

Death 

After being deposed, Hernández Martínez traveled to exile in Guatemala and then later Honduras where he lived until he was stabbed to death at Hacienda Jamastrán, on 15 May 1966, by his taxi driver, Cipriano Morales, whose father had been murdered by Hernández Martínez's dictatorship. He remains one of the oldest politicians to be assassinated.

Personal life 

Hernández Martínez married Concepción Monteagudo and they had eight children: Alberto, Carmen, Esperanza, Marina, Eduardo, Rosa, Gloria, and Maximiliano. 

His relationship with his family became strained as he strayed from his family's religion, Roman Catholicism, and became a theosophist. He was a vegetarian due to his religious beliefs. He was a believer in fringe occultism. He was abstemious, a habit that was strictly instilled in him by his father. When a smallpox epidemic broke out in San Salvador he had colored lights hung around the city, in the belief that this would cure the disease. He also believed in reincarnation and once stated, "it is a greater crime to kill an ant than a man, for when a man dies he becomes reincarnated, while an ant dies forever".

Legacy 

Much of El Salvador is still divided over the legacy of Hernández Martínez's tenure. While El Salvador had seen economic growth during his leadership and he was admired by the wealthy elite, the country experienced widespread social unrest, most significantly the 1932 Salvadoran peasant massacre, where 25,000 people were sentenced to death, many just for having an indigenous appearance. Those who were captured alive were sent to trial and inevitably sentenced to death. In terms of civil rights, his record was mixed. He expanded voting rights to women for the first time, enacted some social security programs, and attempted to manage the economy, in contrast to the economic policies of Liberal regimes that had ruled El Salvador since the 1870s. But his regime censored the media, banned political opposition, abolished local elections, rigged national elections, and brutally killed thousands of dissidents and innocents.

During the country's civil war from 1979 to 1992, an extreme right-wing death squad named after him, called the "Maximiliano Hernández Martínez Anti-Communist Brigade," operated in the country and claimed responsibility for the assassination of many Christian Democrat and Marxist politicians as well as innocent civilians in El Salvador in 1980.

Awards and decorations 

  Grand Cordon of the Order of Leopold
 
  Grand Cross of the Order of the Quetzal

  Grand Cordon of the Order of the Illustrious Dragon
  Grand Cordon of the Order of the Pillars of State
 Spain
  Collar of the Order of Isabella the Catholic
  Cruz de Guerra for officials and subofficials

See also 

 Military dictatorship in El Salvador

References

Citations

Bibliography

External links 

 Maximiliano Hernández Martínez. Presidente 1931–1944 (2003), University of Central America

1882 births
1966 deaths
People from La Libertad Department (El Salvador)
Salvadoran people of Spanish descent
Presidents of El Salvador
Vice presidents of El Salvador
Defence ministers of El Salvador
Salvadoran anti-communists
Salvadoran Theosophists
Leaders who took power by coup
World War II political leaders
Assassinated Salvadoran politicians
Salvadoran people murdered abroad
People murdered in Honduras
Deaths by stabbing in Honduras
Salvadoran military personnel
Salvadoran exiles
Salvadoran expatriates in Honduras
Assassinated people
Politicide perpetrators
Genocide perpetrators
Leaders ousted by a coup
Salvadoran nationalists
People from San Salvador
1966 murders in North America
Fascism in El Salvador